Phanoxyla is a monotypic moth genus in the family Sphingidae first described by Walter Rothschild and Karl Jordan in 1903. Its only species, Phanoxyla hystrix, described by Rudolf Felder in 1874, is known from northern South America, including Brazil and Ecuador.

Adults are probably on wing year round.

References

Macroglossini
Monotypic moth genera
Taxa named by Walter Rothschild
Moths of South America